"Hello Love" is a 1974 single by Hank Snow. "Hello Love" was Snow's seventh and final number one on the U.S. country singles chart, and his first number one in twelve years. The single stayed at number one for a single week and spent a total of ten weeks on the chart.

When "Hello Love" peaked in popularity, Snow (at 59 years, 11 months) became the oldest singer to have a No. 1 song on the Billboard Hot Country Singles chart. The record stood for more than 26 years, until Kenny Rogers (at 61 years, 9 months), eclipsed the record with "Buy Me a Rose."

In the media
From 1974 to 1987, the song was the theme to A Prairie Home Companion.

Chart performance

References

1974 singles
Hank Snow songs
Song recordings produced by Chet Atkins
Songs written by Betty Jean Robinson
1974 songs